The list of shipwrecks in May 1827 includes some ships sunk, wrecked or otherwise lost during May 1827.

1 May

2 May

3 May

4 May

5 May

7 May

8 May

14 May

15 May

17 May

18 May

23 May

26 May

27 May

29 May

Unknown date

References

1827-05